Desmond Kon Zhicheng-Mingdé (born 1980) is a poet, former journalist, interdisciplinary artist and founder of Squircle Line Press. He has authored six poetry collections, an epistolary novel, and edited more than fifteen books. He has an MFA in creative writing, and is also an avid potter.

Desmond studied sociology and mass communication at the National University of Singapore. He went on to receive his theology masters (world religions) from Harvard University and fine arts masters (creative writing) from the University of Notre Dame. He was trained in book publishing at Stanford University.

In 2014, he won the Poetry World Cup while representing Singapore. He is the curator of the "eye feel write" ekphrastic collaboration between the Singapore Writers Festival, the Singapore Arts Museum and the National Gallery Singapore. He is also a mentor for the National Arts Council's Mentor Access Project. In 2016, he co-won the Singapore Literature Prize for English Poetry for his poetry collection, "I Didn't Know Mani Was a Conceptualist", published with Math Paper Press.

References

External links 
 Desmond Kon

Singaporean journalists
Singaporean people of Chinese descent
Singaporean poets
Male poets
Living people
National University of Singapore alumni
University of Notre Dame alumni
Harvard Divinity School alumni
1980 births